Japan participated in the 2018 Asian Games as a competing nation, in Jakarta and Palembang, Indonesia, from 18 August to 2 September 2018.

Medalists

|  style="text-align:left; vertical-align:top;"|
By sport events

|  style="text-align:left; vertical-align:top;"|
Timeline

The following Japan competitors won medals at the Games.

Demonstration events

Competitors 
The following is a list of the number of competitors representing Japan that participated at the Games:

Demonstration events

Archery 

Recurve

Compound

Artistic swimming 

Japan has fielded a squad of nine artistic swimmers to compete in the women's duet and team events.

FR: Reserved in free routine; TR: Reserved in technical routine.

Athletics 

Men
Track & road events

Field events

Combined events – Decathlon

Women
Track & road events

Field events

Combined events - Heptathlon

Mixed

Badminton 

Nippon Badminton Association announced its squad of 20 players (10 men's and 10 women's) on 6 June 2018.

Men

Women

Mixed

Baseball

Japan participated in the baseball competition at the Games, and the team were drawn in the group A.

Roster
The following is the Japan roster (Samurai team) for the men's baseball tournament of the 2018 Asian Games. The team of 24 players was officially named on 18 June 2018. The team remain of 23 players after Shunpei Yoshikawa withdrawal  from the Games.

Round 2 – Group A

Super round

Final

Basketball 

Summary

5x5 basketball
Japan men's team will compete in group C at the Games, while the women's team in group Y.

Men's tournament

Roster
The following is the Japan roster in the men's basketball tournament of the 2018 Asian Games.

}

Group C

Quarter-final

Classification 5th–8th

Seventh place game

Women's tournament

Roster
The following is the Japan roster in the women's basketball tournament of the 2018 Asian Games.

}

Group Y

Quarter-final

Semifinal

Bronze medal game

3x3 basketball
Japan national 3x3 team participated in the Games. The men's team placed in the pool C and the women's team in the pool B based on the FIBA 3x3 federation ranking.

Men's tournament

Roster
The following is the Japan roster in the men's 3x3 basketball tournament of the 2018 Asian Games.
Ryuto Yasuoka (10)
Hayate Arakawa (14)
Tensho Sugimoto (23)
Yoshiyuki Matsuwaki (24)

Pool C

Quarter-final

Women's tournament

Roster
The following is the Japan roster in the women's 3x3 basketball tournament of the 2018 Asian Games.
Ririka Okuyama (4)
Norika Konno (8)
Miwa Kuribayashi (16)
Kiho Miyashita (18)

Pool B

Quarter-final

Semifinal

Gold medal game

Bowling 

Men

Women

Boxing 

Men

Women

Canoeing

Slalom

Sprint

Qualification legend: QF=Final; QS=Semifinal

Canoe polo (demonstration)

Contract bridge 

Men

Mixed

Cycling

BMX

Mountain biking

Road

Track

Sprint

Team sprint

 Riders who entered the competition but did not participating in any phase of the team event.
Qualification legend: FA=Gold medal final; FB=Bronze medal final

Pursuit

 Riders who participated in the heats only and received medals.
Qualification legend: FA=Gold medal final; FB=Bronze medal final

Keirin

Qualification legend: FA=Gold medal final; FB=Bronze medal final

Omnium

Madison

Diving 

Men

Women

Equestrian 

Dressage

Eventing

Jumping

 – indicates that the score of this rider does not count in the team competition, since only the best three results of a team are counted.

Esports (demonstration) 

Hearthstone

Pro Evolution Soccer

Fencing 

Individual

Team

Field hockey 

Japan men's and women's team qualified automatically via 2014 Asian Games, both teams were placed in the pool A respectively.

Summary

Men's tournament 

Roster

Pool A

Semifinal

Gold medal game

Women's tournament 

Roster

Pool A

Semifinal

Gold medal game

Football 

Japan men's team were drawn in group D, while the women's team in group C.

Summary

Men's tournament 

Roster

Group D

Round of 16

Quarter-final

Semi-final

Gold medal game

Women's tournament 

Roster

Group C

Quarter-final

Semi-final

Gold medal game

Golf 

Men

Women

Gymnastics

Handball 

Japan men's and women's team were drawn in group B respectively.

Summary

Key:
 ET – After extra time
 P – Match decided by penalty-shootout.

Men's tournament 

Roster

Hozuki Higashinagahama
Kenya Kasahara
Akihito Kai
Kohei Narita
Jin Watanabe
Motoki Sakai
Hiroki Shida
Hiroki Motoki
Hiroyasu Tamakawa
Kairi Kochi
Tatsuki Yoshino
Yuto Agarie
Naohiro Hamaguchi
Daichi Komuro
Tetsuya Kadoyama

Group B

Main round (Group I)

Semifinal

Bronze medal game

Women's tournament 

Roster

Kimiko Hida
Mika Nagata
Kaho Sunami
Sayo Shiota
Asuka Fujita
Aya Yokoshima
Minami Itano
Chie Katsuren
Hitomi Tada
Natsumi Akiyama
Nozomi Hara
Mana Ohyama
Shiori Nagata
Miyuki Terada
Tomomi Kawata
Mayuko Ishitate

Group B

Semifinal

Bronze medal game

Judo 

All Japan Judo Federation delegate 14 judokas (7 men's and 7 women's) to compete at the Games.

Men

Women

Mixed

Kabaddi

Summary

Men's tournament

Team roster

Masayuki Shimokawa
Takamitsu Kono
Terukazu Nitta
Kazuhiro Takano
Tetsuro Abe
Etsuki Manita
Masaki Hatakeyama
Yuten Kawate
Takuya Kikuchi
Tetsuya Itagaki

Group B

Women's tournament

Team roster

Yoko Ota
Eri Kasahara
Miho Echizenya
Yumi Kaneko
Minami Ito
Yukiko Hayafuji
Mayuko Ito
Haru Inoue
Serina Takahashi
Chiharu Midorikawa

Group A

Karate

Kurash 

Men

Modern pentathlon 

Japan entered four pentathletes (2 men's and 2 women's) at the Games.

Paragliding 

Men

Women

Pencak silat 

Seni

Roller sports

Skateboarding

Rowing 

Men

Women

Rugby sevens 

Japan rugby sevens men's and women's team entered the group B at the Games.

Men's tournament 

Squad
The following is the Japan squad in the men's rugby sevens tournament of the 2018 Asian Games. The team of 12 players was officially named by the Japan Rugby Football Union.

Hashino Kosuke
Taisei Hayashi
Kano Ryota
Chihito Matsui
Naoki Motomura
Rikiya Oishi
Dai Ozawa (Captain)
Katsuyuki Sakai
Kameli Soejima
Tevitangongokilitoto Tupou
Lote Tuqiri
Taichi Yoshizawa

Group B

Quarterfinal

Semifinal

Gold medal game

Women's tournament 

Squad
The following is the Japan squad in the women's rugby sevens tournament of the 2018 Asian Games. The team of 12 players was officially named by the Japan Rugby Football Union.

Padivakalolo Laityelmiyo
Yume Hirano
Kozasa Tomomi
Ano Kuwai
Nagata Iroha
Chiharu Nakamura (Captain)
Yume Okuroda
Fumiko Otake
Sayaka Suzuki
Emii Tanaka
Noriko Taniguchi
Yukari Tateyama

Group B

Quarterfinal

Semifinal

Gold medal game

Sailing

Men

Women

Mixed

Sambo 

Key:
 SU – Won by submission.

Sepak takraw 

Men

Women

Shooting 

Men

Women

Mixed team

Soft tennis

Softball 

Summary

Roster

Haruka Agatsuma
Mana Atsumi
Yamato Fujita
Yukari Hamamura
Nodoka Harada
Yuka Ichiguchi
Kyoko Ishikawa
Hitomi Kawabata
Misato Kawano
Nozomi Nagasaki
Minori Naito
Natsuko Sugama
Yukiko Ueno
Eri Yamada
Yu Yamamoto
Saori Yamauchi
Saki Yamazaki

Preliminary round
The top four teams will advance to the Final round.

Semifinal

Final

Sport climbing 

Speed

Combined

Squash 

Singles

Team

Swimming

Men

 Swimmers who participated in the heats only and received medals.

Women

 Swimmers who participated in the heats only and received medals.

Mixed

 Swimmers who participated in the heats only and received medals.

Table tennis 

Individual

Team

Taekwondo

Poomsae

Kyorugi

Tennis 

Men

Women

Mixed

Triathlon 

Individual

Mixed relay

Volleyball

Beach volleyball

Indoor volleyball

Men's tournament

Team roster
The following is the Japanese roster in the men's volleyball tournament of the 2018 Asian Games.

Head coach:  Gordon Mayforth

Pool C

Playoff

Quarterfinal

5th place game

Women's tournament

Team roster
The following is the Japanese roster in the women's volleyball tournament of the 2018 Asian Games.

Head coach: Kumi Nakada

Pool A

Quarterfinal

Semifinal

Bronze medal game

Water polo 

Summary

Key:
 FT – After full time.
 P – Match decided by penalty-shootout.

Men's tournament

Team roster
Head coach: Yoji Omoto

Katsuyuki Tanamura (GK)
Seiya Adachi (D)
Harukiirario Koppu (CB)
Mitsuaki Shiga (D)
Takuma Yoshida (D)
Atsuto Iida (CB)
Takumu Miyazawa (CF)
Mitsuru Takata (D)
Atsushi Arai (D)
Yusuke Inaba (D)
Keigo Okawa (CB) (C)
Kenta Araki (CF)
Tomoyoshi Fukushima (GK)

Group B

Quarter-final

Semifinal

Gold medal game

Women's tournament

Team roster
Head coach: Makihiro Motomiya

Minami Shioya (GK)
Yumi Arima (CB)
Akari Inaba (D)
Shino Magariyama (D)
Chiaki Sakanoue (D)
Minori Yamamoto (D)
Maiko Hashida (D)
Yuki Niizawa (D)
Kana Hosoya (D)
Misaki Noro (D)
Marina Tokumoto (CB)
Kotori Suzuki (D) (C)
Miyuu Aoki (GK)

Round robin

Weightlifting

Japan Weightlifting Association entered the Games with 15 weightlifters (8 men's and 7 women's).

Men

Women

Wrestling 

Key:
 F – Victory by fall.
 PP – Decision by points – the loser with technical points.
 PO – Decision by points – the loser without technical points.
 ST – Great superiority – the loser without technical points and a margin of victory of at least 8 (Greco-Roman) or 10 (freestyle) points.

Men's freestyle

Men's Greco-Roman

Women's freestyle

Wushu 

Taolu

References 

Japan at the Asian Games
Nations at the 2018 Asian Games
2018 in Japanese sport